"OPO" or "Opo" can refer to:

OnePlus One, a smartphone model produced by the Chinese company OnePlus 
Optical parametric oscillator
Francisco de Sá Carneiro Airport, known by IATA code OPO
Organ procurement organization, which helps to arrange organ donation
One-man operation, also known as one person operation in road passenger transport where a driver of a vehicle has sole responsibility for operating the vehicle 
Lagenaria siceraria, a squash commonly known as opo
Opo the Dolphin,  a famous dolphin in New Zealand
Online Presence Ontology
Orlando Philharmonic Orchestra
Orlando Pops Orchestra
Ovamboland People's Organization